A voyeur is someone who watches other people engaged in intimate behaviors.

Voyeur or Voyeurs may also refer to:

Film
The Voyeur (1970 film), an Italian film
The Voyeur (1994 film), an Italian film
Voyeur (film), a 2017 American film
The Voyeurs, 2021 American film

Music

Albums
Voyeur (Berlin album)
Voyeur (Kim Carnes album)
Voyeur (Saint Motel album)
Voyeur (David Sanborn album)
Voyeurs (album), an album by 2wo
Voyeur (War from a Harlots Mouth album)
Voyeur, an album by Renato Zero

Songs
"Voyeur" (Blink-182 song)
"Voyeur" (Kim Carnes song)

Other uses
Voyeur (manga), a Japanese manga series by Hideo Yamamoto
Voyeur (video game), a 1993 video game series
Voyeur (horse), a show jumping horse
Voyeur, a sworn official of a Visite Royale in Jersey